Qimmatgul Khudoberdievna Aliberdiyeva is a Tajikistani politician.

Aliberdeyeva served as Deputy Chairperson of the Committee for Family and Women's Affairs of Tajikistan under Khayrinisso Yusufi, and in 2015 was elected to the National Assembly, the upper house of the Parliament of Tajikistan, as a representative of the Gorno-Badakhshan Autonomous Region, of which she also served as deputy governor. In 2014, President of Tajikistan Emomali Rahmon named her acting mayor of Khorog; he relieved her of the post in 2016 when she reached retirement age.

References

Living people
Members of the Supreme Assembly (Tajikistan)
Mayors of places in Tajikistan
Women mayors of places in Tajikistan
People from Gorno-Badakhshan Autonomous Region
21st-century Tajikistani women politicians
21st-century Tajikistani politicians
Year of birth missing (living people)